Prémeyzel is a commune in the Ain department in eastern France.

Population

The inhabitants of the town are called Prémeyzélans.

See also
Communes of the Ain department

References

Communes of Ain
Ain communes articles needing translation from French Wikipedia